Camp Asaka is a base of the Japan Ground Self-Defense Force. It lies in four municipalities: Nerima, Tokyo; Asaka, Saitama; Wako, Saitama; and Niiza, Saitama. It serves as the headquarters of the Eastern Army.

The camp was originally the site of a golf course from 1930 to 1940. It served as the site of the Imperial Japanese Army Junior Military Academy from 1941 to 1945, and as a United States Army camp (South Camp Drake) from 1945 to 1960, during which time it housed part of the 1st Cavalry Division.

The Asaka Shooting Range was a firing range constructed on the site for the 1964 Summer Olympics in Tokyo, and hosted pistol and rifle shooting and the shooting part of the modern pentathlon. It is the temporary shooting venue for the 2020 Summer Olympics.

References

Venues of the 1964 Summer Olympics
Venues of the 2020 Summer Olympics
Defunct sports venues in Japan
Olympic modern pentathlon venues
Olympic shooting venues
Sports venues in Saitama Prefecture
Shooting ranges in Japan
Military facilities in Tokyo
Japan Ground Self-Defense Force bases